Faezeh Jalali (born 1980) is an Indian–Iranian actress, director, writer, producer and activist. She is known for Slumdog Millionaire (2008), Shaitan (2011) and the play Jaal (2012).

Personal life and education
She is a fourth generation Iranian born to an Iranian Muslim family residing in India and grew up in Mumbai. After schooling at JB Petit High School, she attended Beloit College in Wisconsin, USA, where she studied theatre arts and also took pre-medical background classes for dental school. Jalali joined theatre and went on to obtain a Master of Fine Arts at the University of Tennessee and Clarence Brown Theatre at Knoxville.

Career
Jalali's theatre acting performances include, Mira Nair's stage musical Monsoon Wedding, I Don’t Like It, As You Like It and other productions such as Jatinga, The Djinns of Eidgah, Thook, A Midsummer Night’s Dream, Arms and the Man, The Trestle at Popelick Creek. She also directed her own plays such as 07/07/07 and Shikhandi- The Story of the In-betweens, which won the Best Ensemble Cast at the Mahindra Excellence in Theatre Awards (META) 2016 and 2018 for which Jalali was also nominated for the Best Director.

She also played roles in movies such as Slumdog Millionaire and kurbaan and was part of the Indian action-thriller television series 24.

Sports
Jalali is a trained acrobatic aerialist. She represented Iran at the 1st Mallakhamb World Championships which was held at Mumbai in 2019. She participated in the rope category.

Filmography

Films
Her work as an actress includes films such as:

Television

Theatre
Director:
Jaal (2012)
Shikandi (2016)
‘07/07/07 (2016)

References

External links

Living people
1980 births
Actresses from Mumbai
Indian people of Iranian descent
Indian film actresses
Indian television actresses
Indian stage actresses
Indian casting directors
Women casting directors
Actresses in Hindi cinema
Actresses in Punjabi cinema
Actresses in Hindi television
Screenwriters from Mumbai
Indian theatre managers and producers
Indian women theatre directors
Indian women screenwriters
Activists from Maharashtra
Indian women activists
Iranian film actresses
Iranian television actresses
Iranian stage actresses
Iranian theatre directors
Iranian screenwriters
Iranian women activists
Female acrobatic gymnasts
Beloit College alumni
University of Tennessee alumni
21st-century Indian actresses
21st-century Iranian actresses